Anti Anti Generation is the tenth studio album by the Japanese rock band Radwimps. It was released on December 12, 2018 by EMI Records and Universal. The album reached No. 1 on the Japanese albums chart.

Track listing

Charts

Weekly charts

Year-end charts

Accolade

References

2018 albums
Radwimps albums
Universal Music Japan albums
EMI Records albums
Universal Music Group albums